The Anne C. and Frank B. Semple House is a historic house in the Stevens Square/Loring Heights neighborhood of Minneapolis, Minnesota, United States. It is located on the same block as the George R. Newell House and the George W. and Nancy B. Van Dusen House. The house was listed on the National Register of Historic Places in 1998.

The house was built in the Beaux-Arts architectural style, reflecting a shift in style toward the classicism of the Renaissance and away from Victorian ideals.  Its first owner, Frank Semple, was a partner in Janney, Semple, and Co., a wholesale hardware firm.  The entry on Franklin Avenue has a balustraded entry porch with Ionic columns, a detailed Palladian window, and a rounded bay.  The interior has a reception hall with mahogany paneling, a hardwood floor with marble inlays, and a frescoed ceiling.  Interior spaces include a  living room and a ballroom.

The mansion is now available as a reception site for weddings and other events.

References

External links
 The Semple Mansion

Houses completed in 1901
Houses in Minneapolis
Houses on the National Register of Historic Places in Minnesota
National Register of Historic Places in Minneapolis